The 2003–04 Welsh Premier League was the 12th season of the Welsh Premier League since its establishment as the League of Wales in 1992. It began on 15 August 2003 and ended on 1 May 2004. The league was won by Rhyl. Defending champions Barry Town F.C. were relegated after seven league championships and ten seasons in the Premiership.

League table

Results

References

Cymru Premier seasons
1
Wales